Arthur Vickers VC (2 February 1882 – 27 July 1944) was an English soldier and a recipient of the Victoria Cross, the highest and most prestigious award for gallantry in the face of the enemy that can be awarded to British and Commonwealth forces. He was also awarded the French Croix de Guerre.

Details
Vickers was 33 years old, and a private in the 2nd Battalion, The Royal Warwickshire Regiment, British Army during the First World War when the deed took place for which he was awarded the VC. The citation stated:

He received his medal from George V at Buckingham Palace in 1916.

Further information

He later achieved the rank of sergeant, and served in the army until 1935. He died in Birmingham in 1944 and is buried at the city's Witton Cemetery.

The medal
His Victoria Cross is displayed at the Royal Regiment of Fusiliers Museum (Royal Warwickshire), Warwick, England.

References

Monuments to Courage (David Harvey, 1999)
The Register of the Victoria Cross (This England, 1997)
VCs of the First World War: The Western Front 1915 (Peter F. Batchelor & Christopher Matson, 1999)

1882 births
1944 deaths
Military personnel from Birmingham, West Midlands
British World War I recipients of the Victoria Cross
Royal Warwickshire Fusiliers soldiers
British Army personnel of World War I
Recipients of the Croix de Guerre 1914–1918 (France)
British Army recipients of the Victoria Cross